is a railway station operated by Kobe New Transit on the Rokko Island Line in Kobe, Hyōgo Prefecture, Japan.

Lines
Island Center Station is served by the Rokko Island Line's automated guideway transit, and is located 3.9 kilometers from the terminus of the line at Sumiyoshi Station.

Station layout
Island Center Station has a single island platform.

Platforms

Adjacent stations

History
Island Center Station opened on February 21, 1990.

Railway stations in Kobe
Railway stations in Japan opened in 1990